Sondottia is a genus of Australian plants in the tribe Gnaphalieae within the family Asteraceae, first described by Philip Sydney Short in 1989.

 Species
 Sondottia connata (W.Fitzg.) P.S.Short  - Western Australia
 Sondottia glabrata P.S.Short - Western Australia

References

Asteraceae genera
Endemic flora of Australia
Gnaphalieae
Taxa named by Philip Sydney Short